William Parish Robertson (5 September 1879 – 7 May 1950) was an English cricketer who played first-class cricket for Middlesex County Cricket Club between 1900 and 1919.

Robertson was educated at Harrow School and Trinity Hall, Cambridge.

A wicket-keeper, Robertson also played as a right-handed batsman. He scored 4,510 runs and claimed 61 catches and 15 stumpings in first-class cricket.

References

1879 births
1950 deaths
People educated at Harrow School
Alumni of Trinity Hall, Cambridge
Cambridge University cricketers
English cricketers
Middlesex cricketers
Sportspeople from Lima
Gentlemen cricketers
H. D. G. Leveson Gower's XI cricketers
North v South cricketers
A. J. Webbe's XI cricketers
British expatriates in Peru